Hapalotrema is a genus of trematodes belonging to the family Spirorchiidae.

The genus has cosmopolitan distribution.

Species:

Hapalotrema dorsopora 
Hapalotrema loossii 
Hapalotrema mehrai 
Hapalotrema mistroides 
Hapalotrema orientalis 
Hapalotrema pambanense 
Hapalotrema postorchis 
Hapalotrema synorchis

References

Platyhelminthes